Gynacantha africana is a species of dragonfly in the family Aeshnidae. It is found in Cameroon, Central African Republic, the Republic of the Congo, Ivory Coast, Equatorial Guinea, Gabon, Ghana, Nigeria, and Uganda. Its natural habitats are subtropical or tropical moist lowland forests and shrub-dominated wetlands.

References

Aeshnidae
Insects described in 1807
Taxonomy articles created by Polbot